Out of Business is the sixth album from hip-hop duo EPMD, which changed its initialism for the release from Erick & Parrish Making Dollars to Erick & Parrish Millennium Ducats. Originally scheduled for a February 1999 release, it was released July 20, 1999.

A limited-edition version of the album was released with a bonus greatest hits disc that features tracks spanning from 1987 to 1997. The versions of the tracks from its two first albums are rerecorded versions because EMI would not license these tracks to Def Jam for inclusion.

Critical reception

Track listing

Greatest Hits disc

Samples
Intro
"Going the Distance" by Bill Conti
"Feel the Heartbeat" by The Treacherous Three
"Afro Puffs" by The Lady of Rage
"Funky Soul Makossa" by Nairobi
"One More Chance (Remix)" by The Notorious B.I.G.
Pioneers
"Caught, Can We Get a Witness?" by Public Enemy
"It's Yours" by T La Rock & Jazzy Jay
Hold Me Down
"Christmas Rappin'" by Kurtis Blow
Draw
"Per Qualche Dollaro in Più" by Ennio Morricone
"How High (Remix)" by Method Man & Redman
"To da Break of Dawn" by LL Cool J
U Got Shot
"Brooklyn Zoo" by Ol' Dirty Bastard
"Dove" by Cymande
The Funk
"Do Your Dance" by Rose Royce
Symphony 2000
"Requiem Pour Un Con" by Serge Gainsbourg
"Uccellacci e Uccellini - Titoli Di Testa", from the Pier Paolo Pasolini motion picture, composed by Ennio Morricone and sung by Domenico Modugno
Jane 6
"Papa Was Too" by Joe Tex
"Mary Jane" by Rick James

Charts

Weekly charts

References 

1999 albums
EPMD albums
Def Jam Recordings albums
Albums produced by DJ Scratch
Albums produced by Erick Sermon
Albums produced by Agallah